Nzakara (Ansakara, N’sakara, Sakara, Zakara) is a Zande language spoken in eastern Central African Republic, spilling over into the Democratic Republic of the Congo. It may be intelligible with Zande proper, at least for some speakers.

Writing system

References

Languages of the Central African Republic
Languages of the Democratic Republic of the Congo
Zande languages